The second season of George of the Jungle, an animated television series for children aged 6 to 12 years, was co-produced in 2015 by Singapore-based August Media Holdings and Yowza Digital of Canada. The revival series is based on the original animated series produced in 1967 by Jay Ward and Bill Scott and later remade by Teletoon in 2007.

This revival series takes a new look at George. The show has been redesigned and redeveloped by producer Jyotirmoy Saha of August Media Holdings.

As of April 2016, 52 episodes of George of The Jungle 2015 TV series have been produced and they have been sold in over 160 countries.

Background
The first George of the Jungle animated series came out in 1967. 1997 saw the release of the films George of the Jungle 1 and 2 and in 2007, another George of the Jungle TV series was produced.

Plot
Like any proper jungle king, George is strong. George is pure of heart and George is well not very bright. George is a big-hearted jungle king who throws himself into his job like any teenage boy would – with boundless enthusiasm and reckless abandon.

George lives in a jungle filled with lions, anacondas, swarms of giant bees, skat-talking man eating plants and more. To top it all, there’s a whole array of evil villains gunning for George and his beloved wilderness. From the great hunters Tiger Titherage and Weevil Plumtree, who love nothing more than to mount George above their fireplace, to Dr. Chicago, a dentist-turned-even-more-evil-dentist to Edward Madmun, an English aristocrat who loves fiendish schemes almost as much as high tea!

Riding herd over the craziest jungle on the planet means the insanity comes fast and furious. Thank the jungle spirits he has a few friends who can help him in his twisted adventures like George’s best buddy Ape, science-obsessed Magnolia, headstrong huckster Ursula, Howie the Howler Monkey, the bird-brained Tookie-Tookie Bird, and George’s overworked pachyderm, Shep. George’s screwball logic and ill-conceived plans lead him and his pals into ridiculous situations and crazy detours that drive everyone in the animal kingdom bananas. But in the end, George always rises above the mayhem and saves the day with bizarre George logic that twists expectations and delights audiences.

Starring
Cory Doran as George, Tookie-Tookie Bird
Robert Tinkler as an ape named Ape
Linda Ballantyne as Magnolia 
Bridget Wareham as Ursula 
Taylor Abrahamse as Cuspid
Terry McGurrin as Doctor Chicago
Jeff Lumby as Narrator
Martin Julien as Witch Doctor

Episodes

Notes
Misspelled as "Greg Sulivan" in a title card.

References

2016 Canadian television seasons
2017 Canadian television seasons